The West Indies cricket team toured Bangladesh in November and December 2012. The tour consisted of one Twenty20 (T20), two Test matches and five One Day Internationals (ODIs). This series saw the first Test Match to be held at the Sheikh Abu Naser Stadium, Khulna. At the First Test in Dhaka, West Indian batsman Chris Gayle became the first player to hit a six off the first ball in a Test cricket match.

Venues
All matches were played at the following three grounds:

Tour matches

2-Day Match: Bangladesh Cricket Board XI v West Indians

List A: Bangladesh Cricket Board XI v West Indians

Test series

1st Test

2nd Test

ODI series

1st ODI

2nd ODI

3rd ODI

4th ODI

5th ODI

Twenty20 Series

Only T20I

Media coverage

ESPN also webcast Channel 9's coverage of the entire series live through their WatchESPN application, and have archived it for on-demand replay.

See also
 2012–13 Bangladeshi cricket season

References

2012-13
2012 in Bangladeshi cricket
International cricket competitions in 2012–13
2012 in West Indian cricket
Bangladeshi cricket seasons from 2000–01